Dubanevychi is a village in Lviv Raion, Lviv Oblast in western Ukraine. It belongs to Horodok urban hromada, one of the hromadas of Ukraine. The population of the village is about 1277 people.
Local government is administered by Dubanevytska village council.

Geography 
In territory of village and surrounding area is dominated by gray forest soils, black soils.

History 

The date of establishment the village is considered 1430.
But the first mention of the village in a document dating from 1266 - 1301 years.

In 1870 Mary Fredro has allocated wood and hired of masters to build the church, which was consecrated in 1880 (1892) year.

Until 18 July 2020, Dubanevychi belonged to Horodok Raion. The raion was abolished in July 2020 as part of the administrative reform of Ukraine, which reduced the number of raions of Lviv Oblast to seven. The area of Horodok Raion was merged into Lviv Raion.

Cult constructions and religion 
In the village has a wooden church of St. Nicholas (1870-1892), wooden belfry (1845?) and sculptures of St. John and the Mother of God.

Personalities 
 Mary (Maria) Fredro (1862 – 1937)–- the owner of the village the late 19th century, was the sponsor for the construction of the church of St. Nicholas (1870-1892).

References

External links 
 weather.in.ua

Literature 
 СОФИЯ ИЗ ФРЕДРО ШЕПТИЦКАЯ. МОЛОДОСТЬ И ПРИЗВАНИЕ о. РОМАНА ШЕПТИЦКОГО. Львов. Издавтельство “Свічадо”. 2009

Villages in Lviv Raion